D-Lysergic acid ethylamide (LAE-32) is a derivative of ergine. It is reported to have some LSD-like effects but is weaker and shorter lasting, with an active dose reported to be between 0.5 and 1.5 milligrams.

It was studied by the CIA as part of Project MKULTRA. Documents published by the CIA under the Freedom of Information Act suggest it causes "a schizophrenia-like condition" but it allows people with schizophrenia to remain indifferent to their disorder.

References

Lysergamides